Morris Giwelb (1853 – March 1937) was a British stamp dealer, originally from the Province of Warsaw in Russian Poland, who, in his prime, became one of the most important dealers in the great rarities of philately.

He emigrated to England in 1882 and became a naturalized British citizen in 1887. Giwelb was noted for his genial and unassuming nature which contrasted with the rarity of the material in which he dealt. He owned a modest shop in Leicester Square and later the Strand, before eventually retiring to Brighton with his wife Natalie.

Giwelb was responsible for the unmasking of the forger Dr. Bernhardt Assmus, after he bought forged Penny Black VR official stamps from Assmus. He accompanied the police on a visit to Assmus' premises at 12 Church Street, Islington, and assisted them at Vine Street Police Station in sorting the seized material.

His wife was Natalie Giwelb.

References

Further reading
Interview with Giwelb in the Philatelic Journal of Great Britain, Vol. I, p. 159. (1 November 1891)
Herst, H. (ed.) (1986) Forensic Philately (An Account of the Famous English Stamp Fraud Trials involving Messrs. Bluett, Benjamin, Sarpy, Jeffryes and Dr. Assmus Originally Published in "The Stamp News", 1890-1892). Lake Oswego, Oregon: Herman Herst Jr.

1853 births
1937 deaths
British stamp dealers
Polish emigrants to the United Kingdom